Bulgarian Rock Archives (or Български рок архиви) is the first online encyclopedia dedicated to rock music in Bulgaria. Launched online on 2 August 2013 and includes more than 350 bands and performers from the mid-1960s. The articles are divided in alphabetical order, year of creation, style, location. Profiles of the groups include a short biography, discography, composition, links to videos, and links to official sites and profiles.

Starting 4 June 2015, the site uses a new version, has made an example from the world heavy metal encyclopaedia - Encyclopaedia Metallum, with better features and design. At that time, it includes about 900 bands and performers.

See also 
 List of online music databases
 List of online encyclopedias

References

External links 
 

Bulgarian music
Rock music mass media
Bulgarian-language websites
Bulgarian encyclopedias
Internet properties established in 2013
2013 establishments in Bulgaria